Fertőszentmiklós Airfield , also known as Meidl Airport, is an aerodrome located in the countryside southwest of Fertőszentmiklós, a city in Győr-Moson-Sopron county, Hungary. It is near the border with Austria.

Facilities

Only daylight VFR flights with a filed flight plan are allowed. Customs services to allow international flights are available upon request.

References

Airports in Hungary
Buildings and structures in Győr-Moson-Sopron County